Alfred Maximilien Bonnet (November 3, 1841 in Frankfurt am Main – 1917) was a German Latinist classical scholar. He studied at Bonn University, then was a lecturer at Lausanne 1866–74 and in Paris 1874–81, then lecturer and from 1890 professor at the University of Montpellier. He made the first modern editions of various New Testament Apocrypha.

Works
 Narratio de miraculo a Michaele archangelo Chonis patrato, adjecto Symeonis Metaphrastus de eadem re libello (Paris, 1890)
 Le Latin de Gregoire de Tours (1890)
editions
 Latin - The Book of Miracles of the Apostle Andrew (1885)
 Latin - The Acts of Thomas (Leipzig, 1883)
 Latin - The Acts of Andrew (1895)
 Acta apostolorum apocrypha (1891) in collaboration with Richard Adelbert Lipsius.

References

External links
 

1841 births
1917 deaths
German classical scholars
Writers from Frankfurt
University of Bonn alumni
Academic staff of the University of Montpellier